The Acido-Lenti-1 RNA motif describes a predicted non-coding RNA that is found in bacteria within the phyla acidobacteriota and lentisphaerota.  It is sometimes found nearby to group II introns, but the reason for this apparent association is unknown.

See also
Bacteroidales-1 RNA motif
Collinsella-1 RNA motif
Chloroflexi-1 RNA motif
Flavo-1 RNA motif

References

External links
 

Non-coding RNA